Liberty School District 25  is a school district in Maricopa County, Arizona. It serves Liberty, Rainbow Valley, and parts of Buckeye and Goodyear.

References

External links
 

School districts in Maricopa County, Arizona